Sunnyside Avenue is a streetcar station in Charlotte, North Carolina. The at-grade island platform on Hawthorne Lane is the eastern terminus of the CityLynx Gold Line and serves the Elizabeth neighborhood.

Location 
Sunnyside Avenue station is located between Hawthorne Lane Bridge, over Independence Expressway (US 74/NC 27), and Sunnyside Avenue, in Elizabeth. The immediate area is a mix of single-family homes and multifamily residential buildings. The Plaza-Midwood commercial district is northeast of the station and is known for its eclectic mix of storefronts, bars, restaurants, and residential streets.

History 
Sunnyside Avenue station was approved as the Gold Line Phase 2 terminus in 2013. To facilitate track installation, the Hawthorne Lane bridge was closed from July 2017 until December 2020. The station opened to the public on August 30, 2021.

Station layout 
The station consists of an island platform with two passenger shelters; a crosswalk and ramp provide platform access from Hawthorne Lane. The station's passenger shelters house two art installations by Taiwanese–American artist Amy Cheng. Each World Within Worlds panel features a lace-like pattern etched into the glass. They are deliberately more abstract than works of art at other Gold Line stations and are meant to evoke the quieter aspects of the Elizabeth residential neighborhood.

References

External links
 

Lynx Gold Line stations
Railway stations in the United States opened in 2021
2021 establishments in North Carolina